PVE may refer to:
 Places
 Beech River Regional Airport, Henderson County, Tennessee, United States
 Palos Verdes Estates, California
 Prairie Vista Elementary School, Granger, Indiana, United States
 Science, technology, and medicine
 Portal vein embolization, a preoperative procedure before resection of another portion of the liver
 Prosthetic valve endocarditis, a type of endocarditis
 Proxmox Virtual Environment, an open-source software server for virtualization management
 Partial volume effect: Partial volume (imaging)
 Preventing violent extremism: Violent extremism § Prevention of radicalization and deradicalization
 Pneumatic vacuum elevator, pneumatic tube transport
 Entertainment
 Player versus environment, a category of video games
 Organizations
 Ecologist Green Party of Mexico